Gheens (also Golden Ranch, Vacherie) is an unincorporated community in Lafourche Parish, Louisiana, United States. Its ZIP code is 70355.

Education
Lafourche Parish Public Schools operates public schools.

The area primary schools would be Lockport Lower and Lockport Upper Elementary Schools in Lockport, and the area junior high school is Lockport Middle School in Lockport. The area high school is Central Lafourche High School.

Lafourche Parish Library operates the Gheens Library.

Mardi Gras 
Gheens is one of the only two southeastern Louisiana communities that still practice the traditional Mardi Gras chase, a tradition that has taken place in Gheens dating back to the turn of the 20th century. In this event following the community's annual Mardi Gras parade, masked men or "Mardi Gras" descend from trailers to chase and whip the town's children with willow branches, symbolizing atonement from sin. In order to avoid being whipped, children must kneel and say "pardon," meaning "pardon me" in Cajun French; however, many children choose to run from the Mardi Gras, at risk of being whipped. Mardi Gras flogging is primarily symbolic, and Mardi Gras generally deliver, at most, a light tap on the back of the victim's legs.

Notes

Unincorporated communities in Lafourche Parish, Louisiana
Unincorporated communities in Louisiana
Unincorporated communities in Houma – Thibodaux metropolitan area